Michael R. Knapik (born February 11, 1963) is an American politician who served in the Massachusetts Senate (1995–2013) and Massachusetts House of Representatives (1991–1995). In the state Senate he represented the 2nd Hampden and Hampshire District. He is a member of the Republican Party.

He was born in Westfield, Massachusetts Prior to being sworn into the Senate in 1995, he was a member of the Massachusetts House of Representatives from 1991 to 1995 and a member of the Westfield School Committee from 1986-1990. He was also worked as an aide to State Representative Steven Pierce. His Senate district included Chicopee, Holyoke, Westfield, Easthampton, Granville, Montgomery, Russell, Southampton, Southwick, and Tolland, Massachusetts.

Knapik resigned August 9, 2013 to take a position at Westfield State University, leaving only three Republicans in the state Senate.

He is the brother of Daniel Knapik, who served as Mayor of Westfield from 2010 to 2015.

References

1963 births
Republican Party Massachusetts state senators
Republican Party members of the Massachusetts House of Representatives
People from Westfield, Massachusetts
College of the Holy Cross alumni
Living people